Auswide Bank Ltd, formerly known as Wide Bay Australia, was Australia’s 10th bank listed and trading on the Australian Securities Exchange (ASX).

Its head office is located in Bundaberg, Queensland. Auswide Bank has an asset base of over $4 billion.

History
Auswide Bank has its roots in the Bundaberg-based Burnett Permanent Building Society which was registered in April 1966 and became operational in August 1966. Burnett Permanent and the Maryborough Permanent Building Society amalgamated in 1979 to form Wide Bay Capricorn Building Society.

Following further mergers with the Gympie and North Coast Building Society in 1981 and Gladstone-based  Port Curtis Building Society in 1983, Wide Bay Capricorn Building Society Ltd listed on the ASX in 1994.

The building society began to expand nationally, undergoing a name change in 2003 to become Wide Bay Australia Ltd.

In 2008, Wide Bay Australia merged with the ASX-listed Mackay Permanent Building Society Limited.

On April 1, 2015, Wide Bay Australia became Auswide Bank Ltd, and was Australia’s 10th and Queensland’s third Australian-owned bank that is listed and trading on the ASX.

On December 16, 2015, Auswide Bank announced a partnership with peer-to-peer lender MoneyPlace, announcing both a 20% equity stake and funding of consumer lending.

On December 22, 2015, Auswide Bank announced a merger with the Brisbane based Queensland Professional Credit Union (trading as Your Credit Union). The merger was completed on May 20, 2016.

Bank Structure
The company’s corporate head office is located in Bundaberg, Queensland.   A corporate office is also based in the Brisbane CBD.

Retail Banking
The retail banking division delivers financial services to personal customers.

Business Banking
The business banking division delivers financial services to small-to-medium enterprises.

Third Party Alliances
The third party alliances division delivers financial services via accredited mortgage brokers and introducers.

Community Involvement
Auswide Bank has been involved in supporting communities.

In January 2014, Auswide Bank contributed $50,000 towards the purchase of an Armstrong Siddeley Tourer, the car used by famous Australian aviator Bert Hinkler. The donation allowed the purchase of two vehicles and a year-long rebuild project to commence. Upon completion, the vehicle will be housed in the Hinkler Hall of Aviation as part of the Hinkler Collection, helping to showcase Bundaberg and Australia’s aviation history.

In 2015, Auswide Bank launched a scholarship agreement with CQUniversity, offering $50,000 of scholarships from 2016-2018. From 2016, four students in the first year of an undergraduate Business or Finance/Accounting program will receive an Auswide Bank Scholarship valued at $5000.

Auswide Bank was an inaugural sponsor of the Queensland Youth Achievement Awards.

In January 2016, Auswide Bank received a Bundaberg Regional Council Australia Day Spirit Award in recognition for its contribution in 2015 to developing the local economy and promoting future business professionals and entrepreneurs in the Bundaberg community.

References

External links 

Corporate website

Banks of Australia
Companies listed on the Australian Securities Exchange
Companies based in Queensland
Australian companies established in 2015
Banks established in 2015